The Canterbury by-election was held on 12 February 1953.  It was held due to the resignation of the incumbent Conservative MP, Baker White.  The by-election was won by the Conservative candidate Leslie Thomas.

References

1953 elections in the United Kingdom
By-elections to the Parliament of the United Kingdom in Kent constituencies
1953 in England
History of Canterbury
1950s in Kent
February 1953 events in the United Kingdom